Algernon Township is one of thirty-one townships in Custer County, Nebraska, United States. The population was 332 at the 2000 census. A 2006 estimate placed the township's population at 320.

The Village of Mason City lies within the Township.

See also
County government in Nebraska

References

External links
City-Data.com

Townships in Custer County, Nebraska
Townships in Nebraska